The 1974–75 Southern Football League season was the 72nd in the history of the league, an English football competition.

Wimbledon won the championship, winning their first Southern League title, whilst Bedford Town, Dunstable Town, Gravesend & Northfleet and Hillingdon Borough were all promoted to the Premier Division. Eight Southern League clubs applied to join the Football League at the end of the season, but none were successful.

Premier Division
The Premier Division consisted of 22 clubs, including 18 clubs from the previous season and four new clubs:
Two clubs promoted from Division One North:
Burton Albion
Stourbridge

Two clubs promoted from Division One South:
Bath City
Wealdstone

League table

Division One North
Division One North consisted of 22 clubs, including 20 clubs from the previous season and two clubs, relegated from the Premier Division:
Bedford Town
Worcester City

Also, at the end of the previous season Bletchley Town was renamed Milton Keynes City.

League table

Division One South
Division One South consisted of 20 clubs, including 18 clubs from the previous season and two clubs, relegated from the Premier Division:
Folkestone, who was renamed Folkestone & Shepway at the end of the previous season
Hillingdon Borough

League table

Football League elections
Alongside the four League clubs facing re-election, a total of 12 non-League clubs applied for election, eight of which were Southern League clubs. All the League clubs were re-elected.

See also
 Southern Football League
 1974–75 Northern Premier League

References
RSSF – Southern Football League archive

Southern Football League seasons
S